Chrysocicada is a monotypic genus of true bugs belonging to the family Cicadidae. The only species is Chrysocicada franceaustralae.

The species is found in Australia.

References

Cicadidae
Monotypic Hemiptera genera